Fritz Weitzel (27 April 1904 – 19 June 1940) was a German SS commander during the Nazi era.

Weitzel became a member of the Nazi Party in 1925 and of SS in 1926. In 1930 he was promoted leader of the SS in the Rheinland and Ruhr. He became Polizeipräsident in Düsseldorf in 1933, and Höherer SS- und Polizeiführer West in 1938. During 1939 Weitzel wrote the book Celebrations of the SS Family which described the holidays to be celebrated and how married SS men and their families should celebrate them.  This book, written by Weitzel, described how the Julleuchter, a Yuletide gift by Himmler to the SS, should be used. Following the German invasion of Norway on 9 April 1940, Weitzel was sent to Norway on 21 April to become Höherer SS- und Polizeiführer in the country's capital, Oslo. However, he was  killed two months later by shrapnel in an aerial attack on his home town, Düsseldorf, during a visit on 19 June 1940. 
 He is buried in the cemetery at Düsseldorf.

See also
List SS-Obergruppenführer

References 

1904 births
1940 deaths
SS and Police Leaders
Members of the Reichstag of the Weimar Republic
Members of the Reichstag of Nazi Germany
SS-Obergruppenführer
Waffen-SS personnel killed in action
Deaths by airstrike during World War II